Duncan P. Watson (born 1963) is an American assistant director and former child voice actor, who is known for voicing Charlie Brown from 1975 to 1977.

Early life
Duncan P. Watson was born in Montclair, New Jersey in 1963, he spend most of his life living in Mexico, California and Utah before eventually moving to New Hampshire. He graduated from the University of New Hampshire in 1985.

Career
Watson begin his acting career in 1975 at the age of twelve years old when he was cast as the fifth official voice actor of the Peanuts character Charlie Brown. He voiced Charlie in Be My Valentine, Charlie Brown, You're a Good Sport, Charlie Brown and in Happy Anniversary, Charlie Brown. He then returned to voice the same character in the feature-length movie Race for Your Life, Charlie Brown, which was also his final acting role.

As of 1992, he currently works as an assistant director for the Department of Public Works in Keene, New Hampshire.

Personal life
Watson lives in Southwest, NH with his wife and two daughters, Samantha Ann, and Selma Marie.

Filmography

References

External links

American male child actors
1963 births
Living people
American male television actors
American male film actors
American male voice actors
20th-century American male actors